Tripora is genus of plants in the family Lamiaceae, first described as a genus in 1999. It includes only one known species, Tripora divaricata, native to Japan, Korea, and China (Gansu, Henan, Hubei, Jiangxi, Shaanxi, Shanxi, Sichuan).

It is still referred to by its synonym Caryopteris divaricata in the literature.

References

Lamiaceae
Flora of China
Flora of Eastern Asia
Monotypic Lamiaceae genera